The Turkish Coal Operations Authority (TKİ) is the state-owned enterprise which mines lignite coal in Turkey. Turkey is the third-largest lignite producer in the world, with 7% of total production.   In 2018 TKI mined 30 Mt of which 16 Mt was open pit and 14 Mt underground: and in the same year 20 Mt was sold, 12.6 Mt to power plants and 7.4 Mt to industry and households.  TKİ is on the Global Coal Exit List compiled by the NGO Urgewald (in German). It employs about 4000 people.

Economics 
TKI's annual capital expenditure was ₺198 million (US$57 million) per year between 2016 and 2017., and the largest lignite mine in Turkey is Afşin-Elbistan. TKİ had been profitable but made losses in 2016 and 2017, and in 2021 the Court of Accounts criticised TKİ for losses which could continue for decades.

Methane 
Ventilation air from some mines such as Soma Eynez, contains significant methane; in 2019 studies were being done on how to capture it.

Sources

References

External links 
 TKI article Global Energy Monitor

Mining organizations
Government agencies of Turkey
Coal in Turkey